Steven C. Brist (born January 16, 1954) is an American attorney and former Democratic politician.  He served three terms in the Wisconsin State Assembly and currently works as an assistant city attorney for Madison, Wisconsin.

Early life and career
Born in Eau Claire, Wisconsin, he moved with his family to Chippewa Falls as a child and graduated from Chippewa Falls High School.  He became involved with politics from an early age, and was a member and chairman of the Chippewa County Young Democrats.  He attended Georgetown University, worked as an intern on the staff of Congressman Dave Obey.  He did not graduate from Georgetown, and instead transferred to the University of Wisconsin–Madison.  While in Madison, he worked as a legislative page and was subsequently hired as a legislative assistant, working more than 3 years in the Assembly before graduating with his bachelor's degree in 1976.

Also that year, at age 22, he made his first attempt at elected office, running for a seat on the Chippewa County Board of Supervisors and defeating former Chippewa Falls mayor Robert Halbleib.  While running for office, he also volunteered for the brief 1976 Democratic primary campaign of U.S. Senator Mo Udall, who was challenging frontrunner Jimmy Carter in the Wisconsin presidential primary.

Wisconsin Assembly

Later that year, with the announcement that Assembly Majority Leader Terry A. Willkom would not seek reelection, Brist jumped into the Democratic primary to succeed him in the 67th Assembly district.  He faced a crowded primary field, with four other candidates running, including Willkom's brother, Lawrence Willkom.  Nevertheless, Brist received the endorsement and support of several local labor unions and prevailed in the primary with 29% of the vote.  He won a substantial victory in the general election, taking 70% of the vote against Republican Ralph Hauert.

In his first term in the Assembly, he was elected Democratic caucus secretary—an unusual honor for a freshman representative.  He proposed a number of changes to the Constitution of Wisconsin to update or remove obsolete language, such as a voting-age requirement which had been superseded by the Twenty-sixth Amendment to the United States Constitution.

He faced a difficult reelection in 1978, and was one of seven incumbent Assembly Democrats defeated that year.  Shortly after leaving office he began studying at the University of Wisconsin Law School, where he earned his J.D. in 1982.

He ran for office again that year in a rematch with his 1978 opponent, David R. Hopkins, in the newly redrawn 55th Assembly district.  This time, Brist prevailed with 52% of the vote and returned to office for the 1983–1984 session.  Another redistricting occurred in that legislative session, and Brist won his third term in 1984 back in the 67th Assembly district.  He did not run for a fourth term in 1986.

In his second stint in the Assembly, he was again elected Majority caucus secretary, served as chairman of the Administrative Rules Committee, and was co-chair of the Survey Committee on Tax Exemptions.  He served on the Judiciary Committee in all three of his terms, and served on the Agriculture Committee and Educational Communications Board in the 1983–1984 and 1985–1986 sessions.

Later career

After leaving office, Brist worked for a while with Impact 7, a northwestern Wisconsin community development agency.  But, in 1988 he relocated permanently to Madison, Wisconsin, and was hired as executive director of the Tavern League of Wisconsin, which lobbies on behalf of the interests of state alcoholic beverage retailers.  In 1989, he was embroiled in scandal involving the Tavern League president, Gilbert Meisgeir, in which the organization had laundered campaign contributions to state legislators.  Brist cooperated with the investigation and was never implicated in the criminal activity, which appeared to have ended before his hiring.  That same year, he was also one of several current and former lawmakers who was reported to have received laundered campaign contributions from lobbyist Gary Goyke, though there was never an accusation that he was aware of the illegal nature of the donations.

In 1993, with incumbent Wisconsin State Treasurer Cathy Zeuske seeming likely to run for United States Senate instead of running for another term as Treasurer, Brist prepared a campaign to replace her.  After a vigorous primary campaign, he lost to former Milwaukee State Representative Dismas Becker, who went on to lose the general election to Republican Jack Voight.

Since the 1990s, he has been employed as an assistant city attorney in Madison, specializing in lobbying, elections, and ethics laws.

Personal life and family
Steven Brist's father, George Brist, was a Chippewa Falls alderman.

Brist married Monica Ann Burkert, the daughter of a Chippewa Falls Episcopal priest, on June 16, 1979. Congressman Dave Obey stood for him as best man at the wedding.

References

External links
 Assistant City Attorneys at City of Madison

Politicians from Eau Claire, Wisconsin
Politicians from Chippewa Falls, Wisconsin
Wisconsin lawyers
University of Wisconsin–Madison alumni
University of Wisconsin Law School alumni
1954 births
Living people
Democratic Party members of the Wisconsin State Assembly